Arthur Gordon Smith (March 23, 1899 – February 24, 1973) was an American stage, film, and television actor, best known for playing supporting roles in Hollywood productions of the 1940s.

Life and career 
Born in Chicago, he was a member of the Group Theatre and performed in many of their productions, including Rocket to the Moon, Awake and Sing!, Golden Boy and Waiting for Lefty, all by Clifford Odets; House of Connelly by Paul Green; and Sidney Kingsley's Men in White. The gray-haired actor usually played studious and dignified types in films, such as doctors or butlers.

Smith appeared in many noirish films, including Body and Soul (1947) and In a Lonely Place (1950). He had a key role as a federal agent in 1947's Ride the Pink Horse, starring and directed by Robert Montgomery. Two of these films, In a Lonely Place and Ride a Pink Horse, were based on novels by Dorothy B. Hughes.

Smith was one of the victims of the Hollywood blacklist, which ended most of his film career in 1952. In 1957, he originated the role of Doc in the stage version of West Side Story. Smith only returned occasionally to the film business, for example in an uncredited part in The Hustler. He also worked on television before retiring in 1967. 
He died, aged 73, in Long Island, New York from a heart attack.

Broadway roles

 Broken Dishes (1929) - Sam Green
 The House of Connelly (1931) - Jesse Tate
 Success Story (1932) - Marcus Turner
 Night Over Taos - Captain Mumford
 Awake and Sing! (1935) and (1939) - Myron Berger
 Men in White (1933) - Mr. Hudson
 Waiting For Lefty (1935) - henchman
 Johnny Johnson (1936) - Sgt. Jackson, and as Doctor and as Brother Thomas
 Golden Boy (1937) - Tokio
 Rocket to the Moon (1938) - Phillip Cooper, D.D.S
 West Side Story (1957) - Doc
 All the Way Home (1960) - Father Jackson

Partial filmography

Nancy Drew... Reporter (1939) 
Education for Death (1943, Short) - Narrator (voice)
Edge of Darkness (1943) - Knut Osterholm
Appointment in Berlin (1943) - Dutch Pastor (uncredited)
Government Girl (1943) - Macqueenie (uncredited)
None Shall Escape (1944) - Stys
Uncertain Glory (1944) - Warden (uncredited)
The Black Parachute (1944) - Joseph - Guerilla (uncredited)
Mr. Winkle Goes to War (1944) - McDavid, Head of McDavid's School for Boys (uncredited)
Youth Runs Wild (1944) - Fred Hauser (uncredited)
None but the Lonely Heart (1944) - Mr. Marjoriebanks (uncredited)
A Tree Grows in Brooklyn (1945) - Charley (uncredited)
Framed (1947) - Desk Clerk (uncredited)
Brute Force (1947) - Dr. Walters
Ride the Pink Horse (1947) - Bill Retz
Body and Soul (1947) - David Davis (uncredited)
T-Men (1947) - Gregg
A Double Life (1947) - Wigmaker
Arch of Triumph (1948) - Inspector
Letter from an Unknown Woman (1948) - John
Mr. Peabody and the Mermaid (1948) - Dr. Harvey
Angel in Exile (1948) - Emie Coons
Chicken Every Sunday (1949) - Mr. Johnson (uncredited)
Caught (1949) - Psychiatrist
South of St. Louis (1949) - Bronco
Manhandled (1949) - Detective Lt. Bill Dawson
Red, Hot and Blue (1949) - Laddie Corwin
Song of Surrender (1949) - Mr. Willis
Quicksand (1950) - Mackey
In a Lonely Place (1950) - Mel Lippman
The Next Voice You Hear (1950) - Fred Brannan
South Sea Sinner (1950) - William Grayson
The Killer That Stalked New York (1950) - Anthony Moss
The Sound of Fury (1950) - Hal Clendenning
The Painted Hills (1951) - Pilot Pete
Half Angel (1951) - Policeman Dan (uncredited)
Rose of Cimarron (1952) - Deacon
Just for You (1952) - Leo
The Hustler (1961) - Old Man Attendant (uncredited)
The Moving Finger (1963)

References

External links

1899 births
1973 deaths
Male actors from Chicago
American male film actors
American male stage actors
American male television actors
Hollywood blacklist
People from Long Island
20th-century American male actors